Pánuco may refer to the following places in Mexico:

Pánuco (province)
Pánuco, Veracruz
Pánuco Municipality, Veracruz
Pánuco, Zacatecas
Pánuco de Coronado Municipality, Durango
Pánuco River